Dušan Vujović (born 22 July 1951) is a Serbian economist and politician. He served as the Minister of Finance in the Government of Serbia from 2014 to 2018. He also had short terms as acting Minister of Economy in 2014 and as acting Minister of Defence in 2016.

Education and career
Vujović was born in Požarevac on 22 July 1951. He finished primary and secondary school in hometown and later graduated from the University of Belgrade Faculty of Economics in 1974. He received his Master’s degrees in 1977 and a PhD in 1984 at the Belgrade Faculty of Economics. He did his post-doctoral studies at the University of California, Berkeley.

He has worked as an assistant professor at the Institute of International Politics and Economics in Belgrade and as an assistant at the Belgrade Faculty of Economics, and then as an assistant professor and associate professor at this faculty.
He is a long-time associate of the World Bank. He led the program of advanced training of the staff of ministries of economy of countries in transition of eastern and southern Europe, the former Soviet Union, China and Vietnam. He worked as representative of Serbia and Montenegro in the World Bank’s Board of Governors, led a Bank’s program in Ukraine and was the Bank’s chief economist for Europe and Central Asia.

Since 2011, he has worked as a consultant of the World Bank and USAID in the field of innovation, budget reform and public sector reform.

He has published a number of papers in international journals and is also a professor for economics at the Singidunum University in Belgrade.

Political career

On 27 April 2014, following the 2014 parliamentary elections, Vujović was elected as the Minister of Finance of Serbia in the Government of Serbia, on nomination by the leading government party Serbian Progressive Party (SNS). He also had short stints as acting Minister of Economy in 2014 and as acting Minister of Defence in 2016.

On 7 May 2018, he resigned from the position of Minister of Finance, due to personal reasons. He stated that during his tenure: "measurable results were achieved, among which are macroeconomic stabilization, fiscal consolidation and the definition of structural reforms necessary to ensure that these results are sustained". On 16 May, the National Assembly ratified his resignation and Ana Brnabić, at the time Prime Minister of Serbia  temporarily took over his duties.

Personal life
Vujović is married and has two children. He speaks English and Russian. He is one of the richest ministers in the Government of Serbia, having real estates mainly in Washington, D.C. and Belgrade, which have an estimated worth of nearly $3 million.

Other Activities 

 World Academy of Art and Science, Fellow

References

External links

1951 births
Finance ministers of Serbia
Government ministers of Serbia
Living people
Politicians from Požarevac
Serbian economists
University of Belgrade Faculty of Economics alumni